Beelarongia is a genus of prehistoric lobe-finned fish which lived during the Late Devonian period (Frasnian stage, about 375 to 385 million years ago). Fossils have been found in Victoria, Australia.

References 

Prehistoric lobe-finned fish genera
Devonian bony fish
Prehistoric fish of Australia
Canowindrids
Fossil taxa described in 1987
Frasnian life